Fischbacher may refer to:

 Andrea Fischbacher (born 1985), Austrian alpine skier
 Andreas Fischbacher (born 1973), Austrian ski mountaineer
  (born 1956), German jazz musician
 Christian Fischbacher (1913–2006), Swiss skeleton racer
 Emil Fischbacher,  (1903–1933), Scottish Protestant Christian missionary to Xinjiang
  (1886–1972), German politician
 Martin Siegfried Fischbacher (born 1939) of "Siegfried & Roy"

See also 
 Fischbach (disambiguation)
 Fischbach (surname)

German-language surnames